fa:جریان داده همزمان

Synchronous Data Flow (SDF) is a restriction on Kahn process networks where the number of tokens read and written by each process is known ahead of time. In some cases, processes can be scheduled such that channels have bounded FIFOs.

Limitations 
SDF does not account for asynchronous processes as their token read/write rates will vary. Practically, one can divide the network into synchronous sub-networks connected by asynchronous links. Alternatively a runtime supervisor can enforce fairness and other desired properties.

Applications 
SDF is useful for modeling digital signal processing (DSP) routines. Models can be compiled to target parallel hardware like FPGAs, processors with DSP instruction sets like Qualcomm's Hexagon, and other systems.

See also
Kahn process networks
Petri net
Dataflow architecture
Digital signal processing#Implementation

References

External links
 Synchronous Data Flow, Edward A. Lee and David G. Messerschmitt, 1987
 Embedded Software Systems course - Synchronous Dataflow
 SDF analysis and visualization tools
 Kahn Process Networks and a Reactive Extension

Computer architecture